The Tremeloes are an English beat group founded in 1958 in Dagenham, England. They initially found success in the British Invasion era with lead singer Brian Poole, scoring a UK chart-topper in 1963 with "Do You Love Me". After Poole's departure in 1966, the band achieved further success as a four-piece with 13 top 40 hits on the UK Singles Chart between 1967 and 1971 including "Here Comes My Baby", "Even the Bad Times Are Good", "(Call Me) Number One", "Me and My Life" and their most successful single, "Silence Is Golden" (1967).

Career
They were formed as Brian Poole and the Tremoloes (the spelling "tremoloes" was soon changed because of a spelling mistake in an East London newspaper) influenced by Buddy Holly and the Crickets.

On New Year's Day, 1962, Decca, looking for a beat group, auditioned two promising young bands: Brian Poole and the Tremeloes and another combo (also heavily influenced by Buddy Holly) from Liverpool, the Beatles. Decca chose Brian Poole and the Tremeloes over the Beatles, reportedly based on location – the Tremeloes were from the London area, making them more accessible than the Liverpool-based Beatles.

The original quintet consisted of lead vocalist Brian Poole, lead guitarist Rick West (born Richard Westwood), rhythm guitarist/keyboardist Alan Blakley, bassist Alan Howard and drummer Dave Munden.

Brian Poole and the Tremeloes first charted in the UK in July 1963 with a pop rock cover version of "Twist and Shout", a song previously popularised in America by the Isley Brothers, and already released by the Beatles in the UK in March 1963 on their first British LP, Please Please Me. They released a pop cover version of US hit "Do You Love Me" in the same year, and the song reached No. 1 on the UK Singles Chart. The group also had success in the UK in 1964 with covers of Roy Orbison's B-side "Candy Man" and a previously obscure Crickets B-side ballad, "Someone, Someone": both entered the UK top ten, the latter peaking at No. 2. Other Decca-era chart singles included "Three Bells" and a version of "I Want Candy". 

With Poole leaving to attempt a solo career (which proved unsuccessful) in 1966, the Tremeloes continued as a four-piece band with a revised line-up (Howard left the band in 1966). Len "Chip" Hawkes, (father of Chesney Hawkes), replaced Howard.

Their first single as a four-piece, released on Decca, was a cover of Paul Simon's song "Blessed", which failed to chart. After switching from Decca to CBS Records, with Mike Smith producing, The Tremeloes' first single on CBS was a cover of The Beatles Revolver song "Good Day Sunshine". This also failed to chart, but established a new image of a more contemporary group in tune with the times, which set them up for future continued chart singles as they then started a successful hit run from 1967 onwards with Cat Stevens' "Here Comes My Baby"; "Hello World"; three Italian hits translated into English: "Suddenly You Love Me", which is Riccardo Del Turco's "Uno tranquillo" ("One quiet man"), "I'm Gonna Try", which is Riccardo Del Turco's 1968 hit "Luglio" ("July"), and "My Little Lady", based on Orietta Berti's "Non illuderti mai" ("Never deceive yourself"); and their number one recording of a Four Seasons B-side "Silence Is Golden". Both this last single and "Here Comes My Baby" also entered the Top 20 of the U.S. Billboard Hot 100 on Epic Records, co-owned by CBS.

All members shared vocals, though most of the songs featured either Hawkes or drummer Dave Munden as the lead singer. Guitarist Rick Westwood sang falsetto co-lead vocal with Hawkes' lower range vocal and group harmonies also featured on "Silence Is Golden". Their regular hits were accompanied by frequent appearances on BBC's Top of the Pops TV programme. Their songs were popular with younger music fans and parents rather than rock music fans, although their albums and B-sides included more rock-styled tracks such as band compositions "Try Me" and the instrumental "Instant Whip". Their more commercial songs, such as "Even the Bad Times Are Good" (UK No. 4, 1967), "Helule Helule" (UK No. 14, 1967), "Suddenly You Love Me" and "My Little Lady" (both UK No. 8 in 1968), proved to be more popular than the falsetto-led "Be Mine" sung by Rick Westwood, which stalled in the lower top 40, or a string-accompanied cover of Bob Dylan's "I Shall Be Released" (UK No. 29, 1969), but the more ambitious group-composed "(Call Me) Number One" reached No. 2 in the UK in 1969. Altogether, without Poole the group had nine UK Top 20 hits.

Westwood and Blakley were dual lead guitarists with guitar/sitar and banjo, pedal steel guitar and keyboards featured on their songs. Hawkes could play drums in addition to bass guitar. 

Their cover version of Jeff Christie's song "Yellow River" (sung by Dave Munden) was shelved at the time, but Christie's lead vocal set to their backing became a UK chart hit for Christie in 1970. The Tremeloes versions sung in both English and Spanish later were released on compact disc compilations. "Me and My Life", written by Blakley and Hawkes, was a No. 4 UK chart hit in 1970, while "By the Way" reached No. 35 that year. Their album Master, which they released a few weeks later, failed to sell well. Led Zeppelin and Deep Purple were popular at the time, but the Tremeloes never played hard rock and they had no British hits after "Hello Buddy" (No. 32) in 1971. Nevertheless they recorded several more singles throughout the decade, with further chart singles in Europe, including "Blue Suede Tie" (No. 38, Germany), "Too Late to Be Saved" (No. 33, Germany), "Ride On" (No. 16, Germany), "It's OK (Say Ole If You Love Me)", and "Do I Love You", some of which received heavy airplay, particularly on Radio Luxembourg. "I Like It That Way" even made the Dutch Top 10, reaching No. 9 after the Dutch service of Radio North Sea International promoted it as its weekly Treiterschijf. They also released another three albums of original material, including Shiner (1974) and Don't Let the Music Die (1975).

After the hits
Their music is still available on compact disc, and they quite often play concerts and are part of the pop-revival shows that constantly tour the UK. Their line-up changed several times from 1972 onwards, the first new entrants being Bob Benham and a year later Aaron Woolley (replacing Blakley and Hawkes, both of whom later returned to the band). Munden remained the only constant member. Hawkes pursued a solo career for a while producing two albums for RCA Records in Nashville, Tennessee. In 1979 he returned to England and rejoined the Tremeloes where he remained until 1988. Chip left the Tremeloes to focus on managing his son, Chesney, who had a number one hit record entitled "The One and Only". By 1992 Hawkes was touring once again as a solo artist. In 1983 they covered Europop tune "Words", originally by F. R. David.

As a soloist, Poole failed to chart with subsequent records, but pursued a successful cabaret career. His daughters, Karen and Shelly, hit the charts in 1996 as Alisha's Attic. Blakley died from cancer in June 1996, leaving Munden and West to continue in concert with newer recruits Dave Fryer (bass) and Joe Gillingham (keyboards). Jeff Brown, former bass player and lead vocals for The Sweet, replaced Fryer in 2005. Dave Fryer retired to live in Germany after leaving the band, and continues to write music and play occasionally.

In April 2004, at the request of the Animals, who were about to do their 40th anniversary tour, Hawkes was asked to form a band to tour with the Animals. This he did, bringing together a supergroup including Mick Avory (ex-the Kinks), Eric Haydock (ex-the Hollies), who teamed up to perform as the Class of '64, also featuring guitarists, Telecaster Ted Tomlin and Graham Pollock. The band toured around the world and recorded an album of past band hits and a new single called "She's Not My Child".

Brian Poole, Chip Hawkes and the Tremeloes toured the UK as part of their 40th anniversary reunion in September 2006.

In November 2015, Westwood and Hawkes were both charged with sexual assault relating to a case from 1968.  They were acquitted in July 2016.

In 2019 two separate entities were touring - the latest incarnation of the original Tremeloes with Westwood, Clarke and Hawkes, along with Hawkes' son Jodie and Richard Marsh, and a tribute band "The Trems" with Gillingham, Brown, Twynham and Phil Wright (of the band Paper Lace). Hawkes stated in an interview that Munden had retired following knee issues resulting from a fall. Brian Poole toured with the band again in 2016, and played with his own band Brian Poole & Electrix. As of 2019 he appeared to no longer be actively performing.

Dave Munden (born on 2 December 1943) died on 15 October 2020, at age 76.

In 2021, Chip Hawkes, Rick Westwood, Mick Clarke, Jodie Hawkes and Richard Marsh were still performing live as The Tremeloes on the UK nostalgia circuits, whilst in 2022, Chesney Hawkes joined his brother Jodie as a member, becoming the band's singer for a series of dates.

Members

Current members

The Tremeloes
 Eddie Wheeler – guitar, vocals (2021–present) 
 Len "Chip" Hawkes – bass, vocals (1966–1972, 1979–1988, 2019–present)
 Mick Clarke – bass, vocals (1966–1967, 1992–1996, 2019–present)
 Richard Marsh – guitar, vocals (2019–present)
 Jodie Hawkes – drums, vocals (2019–present)
 Chesney Hawkes – vocals (2022)
The Trems
 Joe Gillingham – keyboards, vocals (1988–present)
 Jeff Brown – bass, vocals (2005–present)
 Syd Twynham – guitar, vocals (2014–present)
 Phil Wright – drums, vocals (2019–present)

Former members
 Rick Westwood – guitar, vocals (1961–2019)
 Dave Munden – drums, vocals (1958–2018) (died 2020)
 Alan Blakley – rhythm guitar, keyboards, vocals (1958–1972, 1979–1996; his death)
 Brian Poole – vocals (1958–1966, 2006, 2016)
 Alan Howard – bass, vocals (1958–1966)
 Ron Townsend – guitar, vocals  (1958-1959)
 Bob Benham – guitar, vocals (1972–1979)
 Aaron Woolley – guitar, vocals (1975–1977)
 Dave Fryer – bass, vocals (1988–2005)
 Eddie Jones – guitar, vocals (2013–2014)
 Paul Carman – bass, rhythm guitar, vocals (1974–1978) (died 2021)
 Frank Hughes – bass

Discography

See also 

 The Beatles' Decca audition

References

Bibliography
 The Guinness Book of 500 Number One Hits –

External links
 
  (The Trems)
 Tremeloes biography and discography at 45-rpm.org.uk
 
 Entries at 45cat.com
 

Musical groups established in 1958
Musical groups from Essex

English pop music groups
English rock music groups
Beat groups
British Invasion artists
Decca Records artists
Epic Records artists
Columbia Records artists
DJM Records artists
1958 establishments in England